was a town located in Kiso District, Nagano Prefecture, Japan.

As of 2003, the town had an estimated population of 7,971 and a density of 53.15 persons per km². The total area was 149.97 km².

On November 1, 2005, Kisofukushima, along with the villages of Hiyoshi, Kaida and Mitake (all from Kiso District), was merged to create the town of Kiso.

Dissolved municipalities of Nagano Prefecture
Kiso, Nagano (town)